Miles Raplee House is a historic home located at Milo in Yates County, New York. This Greek Revival style structure was built about 1845 and features a monumental proportioned temple portico with full pediment and wide entablature supported by massive two story columns.

It was listed on the National Register of Historic Places in 1994.

Historic functions: Single dwelling, Agricultural outbuildings

References

Houses on the National Register of Historic Places in New York (state)
Greek Revival houses in New York (state)
Houses completed in 1845
Houses in Yates County, New York
National Register of Historic Places in Yates County, New York